Maud de Clare, Baroness de Welles was the eldest daughter of Thomas de Clare, Lord of Inchiquin and Youghal, Lord of Thomond, Lord of Bunratty Castle (1245–1287) and Juliana FitzGerald (1236–1290). She married twice. Her first marriage was to Robert de Clifford, 1st Baron de Clifford, 1st Lord of Skipton (1274–1314) on 3 November 1295 by which she had four children. Her second marriage was to Sir Robert de Welles, 2nd Baron Welles, Constable of Pendragon Castle (1297–1326) on 16 Nov 1315. They had no children. She was born in 1276 in Tewkesbury, Tewkesbury Hundred, Gloucestershire, England and moved to Badlesmere to be near her sister, Margaret de Clare, Baroness Badlesmere. She died in Badlesmere in 1327 twice a widow.

Life 
Maud de Clare had an unfortunate life full of drama and controversy. In 1314 at the Battle of Bannockburn both her husband Robert de Clifford, 1st Baron de Clifford and her cousin Gilbert de Clare, 8th Earl of Gloucester, 7th Earl of Hertford, 10th Lord of Clare, 5th Lord of Glamorgan (1291–1314) were both killed in battle. Her second marriage to Robert de Welles, 2nd Baron Welles was done without royal licence and this angered the King of England. She was initially the co-heiress to her nephew's estates along with her sister, Margaret de Clare, Baroness Badlesmere, before the King issued the estates to Lord de Clare's three sisters. Some say this is due to the fact that she married Lord de Welles without royal licence. Maud de Clare and her Sister Margaret were the next heirs of their father's estate which included the Stewardship of the Forest of Essex, the town and castle at Thomond and numerous other properties in Ireland.

References

1276 births
1327 deaths
Anglo-Norman women
14th-century English people
14th-century English women
13th-century English people
13th-century English women
People from Badlesmere, Kent
de Clifford